Judd Medak (born September 20, 1979) is a Canadian former professional ice hockey player.

Medak attended the University of Minnesota Duluth where he played four years (1998 - 2002) of NCAA hockey with the Minnesota–Duluth Bulldogs, scoring 30 goals and 61 assists for 91 points, while earning 293 penalty minutes, in 144 games played.

Medak went on to play three seasons of professional hockey, predominantly in the ECHL where he skated in 141 games, registering 50 goals and 66 assists for 116 points, along with 216 penalty minutes. He also played 23 games in the American Hockey League and 14 games with the Fife Flyers of the British National League.

Awards and honors

References

External links

1979 births
Living people
Nanaimo Clippers players
Merritt Centennials players
Canadian ice hockey left wingers
Chicago Wolves players
Fife Flyers players
Greenville Grrrowl players
Hershey Bears players
Manchester Monarchs (AHL) players
Minnesota Duluth Bulldogs men's ice hockey players
Reading Royals players
Syracuse Crunch players
Ice hockey people from Edmonton
Canadian expatriate ice hockey players in the United States
Canadian expatriate ice hockey players in Scotland